Faces was an English rock band formed in 1969. They released 4 studio albums between 1970 and 1973. The original lineup consisted of Rod Stewart on lead vocals, Ronnie Wood on lead guitar, Ronnie Lane on bass guitar, Ian "Mac" McLagan on keyboards, and Kenney Jones on drums. Lane was replaced by former Free bassist Tetsu Yamauchi in mid 1973, shortly after the release of their final album. The group disbanded in 1975. The original lineup was inducted into the Rock and Roll Hall of Fame in 2012.

Table

Related Pages
Faces
Faces discography
Rod Stewart
Ronnie Wood
Ronnie Lane
Ian McLagan
Kenney Jones
Tetsu Yamauchi
Rod Stewart discography
List of Rock and Roll Hall of Fame inductees

External links
http://www.the-faces.com/discogravy.htm
 [ AllMusic Review]
 Rolling Stone Review
 Paste magazine review

Faces (band) songs